LaRon, Laron, La'Ron or La'ron is a masculine given name and surname. Bearers include:

Given name
 LaRon Bennett (born 1982), American former sprinter and hurdler
 LaRon Byrd (born 1989), American former National Football League player
 LaRon Dendy (born 1988), American basketball player
 LaRon Louis James (born 1982), stage name Juelz Santana, American rapper and member of East Coast hip hop group The Diplomats
 LaRon Landry (born 1984), American former National Football League player
 Laron Profit (born 1977), American basketball coach and former player
 La'Ron Singletary (born 1979/80), American former police chief
 Laron Williams (1949–1985), American serial killer

Surname
 Kenneth La'ron (born 1997), stage name KennyHoopla, American singer, songwriter and musician
 Zvi Laron (born 1927), Israeli paediatric endocrinologist

See also
 Laron syndrome, a medical disorder

Masculine given names